Abdulaziz bin Musaed Al Jiluwi (died February 1977) was a Saudi Arabian military commander. He was the brother-in-law of King Abdulaziz and the maternal uncle of King Khalid.

Personal life, career and death
Abdulaziz bin Musaed bin Jiluwi was the grandson of Jiluwi bin Turki and full brother of Al Jawhara bint Musaed. His sister Al Jawhara married their second cousin Abdulaziz, later the first king of Saudi Arabia. Al Jawhara and Abdulaziz had three children: King Khalid, Prince Mohammed, and Princess Al Anoud. King Abdulaziz sent Abdulaziz bin Jiluwi with a strong contingent of warriors to conquer Asir in 1921. Prince Abdulaziz served as the governor of Hail Province.

Three of Prince Abdulaziz's daughters married to the powerful Sudairi brothers. His daughters Al Anoud (died 1999), Muneera, and Al Jawhara were the wives of King Fahd, Prince Sultan, and Prince Nayef, respectively. Princess Al Jawhara and Prince Nayef had two sons together, Prince Saud and Prince Mohammad. Abdulaziz bin Musaed died in February 1977.

References

1977 deaths
Saudi Arabian princes
Saudi Arabian military personnel
Governors of provinces of Saudi Arabia
20th-century Saudi Arabian politicians